William Gregory Keale (pronounced "kee-ah-lay") (aged 67) is a Hawaiian-American singer-songwriter from Bend, Oregon. He is best known as Israel Kamakawiwoʻole's cousin.

Personal life 
Keale was born on Oahu, Hawaii. He grew up to love Hawaiian music, and was raised by Hawaiian musicians, and spent a lot of time with his uncle Moe Keale, a ukulele virtuoso. His cousin, Kamakawiwoʻole, once told him that the "music is in the bones."

Bill Keale was a former member of the Sons of Hawaii band, and is one of the few people today to have been born in the 20th century with pure Hawaiian ancestry. Today he has a wife named Tiffany and two kids, Mac and Rosie Keale.

Musical career 
Bill Keale's first album, "Islands Away," was released in 1999. His albums feature lyrics in Hawaiian and English. Some of his best-known songs are "After The Rain" from the album of the same name, "Kai'lua Rain," "Ala Ka'i," and his rendition of "Somewhere Over The Rainbow/What a Wonderful World." His albums "Keeper of The Rain" and "After The Rain" were both released on the same day, in July 2002. He also released a Christmas album titled "The Magic of Christmas" in 2006.

Keale has released 7 studio albums, one EP, and a Christmas album. Although he has not released any new music since 2013, he is still active. His albums have received generally positive reviews.

Discography

References 

Year of birth missing (living people)
Hawaiian songwriters
People from Oregon
Living people
American male singer-songwriters
Singer-songwriters from Oregon